The 1959–61 Israel State Cup (Gvia HaMedina) was the 22nd season of Israel's nationwide football cup competition and the seventh after the Israeli Declaration of Independence.

The competition began on 30 January 1960, two months after the conclusion of the former competition. Further rounds, until the eighth round, were played during the remainder of the 1959–60 season. Disagreements within the IFA caused a delay of over 5 months in the competition, and the quarter and semi finals were played in December 1960.

The final was held at the Ramat Gan Stadium on 1 February 1961. Hapoel Tel Aviv, appearing in its first final since 1941, defeated Hapoel Petah Tikva 2–1, winning its 6th cup.

Results

Sixth round

Byes: Hakoah Tel Aviv, Hapoel Herzliya, Hapoel Ramla, Shimshon Tel Aviv.

Replay

Seventh round

Replays

Eighth round

Replays

Quarter-finals

Semi-finals

Final

Notes

References
100 Years of Football 1906–2006, Elisha Shohat (Israel), 2006

Upsets in the fifth round of the State Cup (Page 4) Hadshot HaSport, 27.3.1960, archive.football.co.il 
State Cup games Maariv, 13.4.1960, Historical Jewish Press

External links
 Israel Football Association website

Israel State Cup
State Cup
State Cup
Israel State Cup seasons